South Africa started competing in the African Games since the 1995 All-Africa Games. Its athletes have won a total of 1050 medals.

Medals by Games

Below is a table representing all medals across the Games in which it has competed.

See also 
 South Africa at the Olympics
 South Africa at the Paralympics
 Sports in South Africa

References

External links 
 All-Africa Games index - todor66.com